The Runnins River is a river in the U.S. states of Massachusetts and Rhode Island. It flows approximately 14 km (9 mi).

Course
The river begins in Seekonk, Massachusetts in the swamps east of Prospect Street, near Walker Street. From there, the river flows in a southwesterly direction towards East Providence, Rhode Island, where it then forms the boundary between Massachusetts and Rhode Island. It continues flowing along the state line to its end at Mobil Dam. Below Mobil Dam (the boundary between fresh and salt water), the river broadens out and empties into Hundred Acre Cove and becomes the Barrington River.

Crossings
Below is a list of all crossings over the Runnins River. The list starts at the headwaters and goes downstream.
Seekonk
Prospect Street
Woodward Avenue
Greenwood Avenue
Ledge Road
Arcade Avenue
Taunton Avenue (U.S. 44)
Pleasant Street
Brook Hill Drive
Fall River Avenue (MA 114A)
Leonard Street
East Providence
Warren Avenue
Interstate 195
Highland Avenue (U.S. 6)
Mink Road (RI 114A)
River Road

Tributaries
Aitken Brook and Luthers Brook are the only named tributaries of Runnins River, though it has many unnamed streams that also feed it.

See also
List of rivers in Massachusetts
List of rivers in Rhode Island
Barrington River (Rhode Island)

References
Maps from the United States Geological Survey
Friends of Runnins River

Rivers of Bristol County, Massachusetts
Rivers of Providence County, Rhode Island
Borders of Massachusetts
Borders of Rhode Island
Narragansett Bay
Rivers of Massachusetts
Rivers of Rhode Island